The Ministry of Finance of Armenia is a republican body of executive authority, which elaborates and implements the policies of the Republic of Armenia Government in the areas of fiscal revenue collection, public finance administration.

Former Ministers

First Republic of Armenia 
Khachatur Karchikyan (06.07.1918-04.11.1918)
Artashes Enfiajyan (04.11.1918-24.06.1919)
Grigor Jaghetyan (24.06.1919-05.08.1919)
Sargis Araratyan (10.08.1919-05.05.1920)
Abraham Gyulkhandanyan (05.05.1920-23.11.1920)
Hambardzum Terteryan (25.11.1920-02.12.1920)
Source:

Republic of Armenia 
 Janik Janoyan (18.09.1990-16.02.1993)
 Levon Barkhudaryan (1993-1997)
 Armen Darbinyan (15.05.1997-10.04.1998)
 Edward Sandoyan (20.04.1998-15.06.1999)
 Levon Barkhudaryan (15.06.1999-11.11.2000)
 Vardan Khachatryan (11.11.2000-09.04.2008)
 Tigran Davtyan (21.04.2008-17.12.2010)
 Vache Gabrielyan (17.12.2010-09.04.2013)
 Davit Sargsyan (09.05.2013-26.04.2014)
 Gagik Khachatryan (26.04.2014-20.09.2016)
 Vartan Aramyan (20.09.2016-12.05.2018)
 Atom Janjughazyan (12.05.2018-02.08.2021)
 Tigran Khachatryan (02.08.2021-)
Source:

References

External links 

 Official website

Finance
Armenia
1918 establishments in Armenia